Party divisions of United States Congresses have played a central role on the organization and operations of both chambers of the United States Congress—the Senate and the House of Representatives—since its establishment as the bicameral legislature of the Federal government of the United States in 1789. Political parties had not been anticipated when the U.S. Constitution was drafted in 1787, nor did they exist at the time the first Senate elections and House elections occurred in 1788 and 1789. Organized political parties developed in the U.S. in the 1790s, but political factions—from which organized parties evolved—began to appear almost immediately after the 1st Congress convened. Those who supported the Washington administration were referred to as "pro-administration" and would eventually form the Federalist Party, while those in opposition joined the emerging Democratic-Republican Party.

Party divisions by Congress

The following table lists the party divisions for each United States Congress. Note that numbers in boldface denote the majority party at that particular time while italicized numbers signify a Congress in which the majority party changed intra-term.

Partisan control of Congress

This table shows the number of Congresses in which a party controlled either the House, the Senate, or the presidency.

See also
 Divided government in the United States
 Political party strength in U.S. states

References

External links 
 U.S. Senate: Party Divisions
 Office of the House Clerk: Party Divisions of the House of Representatives

United States Congresses
History of the United States Congress
Political history of the United States
United States history-related lists
Democratic Party (United States)-related lists